The blacktail shiner (Cyprinella venusta) is a small freshwater fish in the family Cyprinidae native to the United States.

Description and anatomy
The blacktail shiner is a somewhat slender minnow with 8-9 rays on the anal fin, and a prominent black spot at the base of the caudal fin (tail fin). The back is usually yellowish-olive, and the sides are silvery with hints of blue. Adults usually reach  in length. The blacktail shiner has a large, black caudal spot which distinguishes it from most other minnows. The caudal spot of the blacktail shiner may be faint, especially in populations inhabiting turbid waters, and they could likely be confused with the red shiner (C. lutrensis); however, the red shiner has 9 anal rays (versus 8) and usually 35 or fewer lateral scales (versus 36 or more).

Geographic distribution
The blacktail shiner occurs in Gulf of Mexico drainages from Suwannee River, Georgia and Florida, to Rio Grande, Texas; Mississippi River basin (mostly on Former Mississippi Embayment) from southern Illinois to Louisiana and west in Red River drainage to western Oklahoma.
 
Blacktail shiners are found in the southern United States west of the Appalachian Mountains. The species ranges east and west from north central Florida to West Texas, and north to southern Illinois. In Texas, blacktail shiners are unknown in the Panhandle, being found primarily from the Edwards Plateau eastward.

The blacktail shiner has also been found from the Rio Grande basin in Texas, east to the Suwannee River, and north through the Mississippi River basin to the confluence of the Ohio River. Two of the three recognized subspecies occur in Alabama. The slender blacktail shiner, C. v. stigmaturus, is found in the upper Mobile River basin (most frequently above the Fall Line), while the eastern blacktail shiner, C. v. cercositgma, occurs in the lower Mobile River basin and coastal rivers draining the state. Intergradations between these subspecies have been recognized in the Alabama, Cahaba, and Tallapoosa river systems.

Ecology and habitat
The blacktail shiner feeds primarily on invertebrates. Its diet includes algae, seeds, and aquatic and terrestrial insects. Aquatic insects and algae were the most common food items of blacktail shiners in the Blanco River, Texas; sediment and detritus were found in 21% of the 36 guts examined. Blacktail shiners feed primarily during the day. Blacktail shiners may serve as major food resource for piscivorous spotted bass (Micropterus punctulatus) during the summer in Village Creek (Neches River), Texas.

The blacktail shiner is most common in pools and runs of clear, sandy-bottomed, small to medium rivers, typically in areas with sparse vegetation and strong current, but upland populations occur in creeks over substrates with more gravel and rubble. Populations in the western part of the species' range are often found in turbid water. Blacktail shiner mesohabitat is ubiquitously distributed among pools, runs, and riffles with silt, gravel, and bedrock substrates. In the Blanco River, Texas, blacktail shiners were most abundant in swift runs in the spring and summer. The species occurred throughout the year in riffle and sandbank habitats in Village Creek (Neches River), Texas. During summer, most individuals were collected from sandbank habitats; they were also found in deep channel and riffle habitats, though no blacktail shiners longer than  occurred in riffles. Juveniles occurred almost exclusively in sandbank mesohabitat during spring. Blacktail shiners are commonly found in sandy or rocky areas of Lake Texoma (Oklahoma/Texas), generally in clearer water of the downstream area; they are occasionally abundant in the tailwaters, and rarely found in the headwaters.

The blacktail shiner hybridizes with the red shiner (C. lutrensis) in Texas and in Illinois.

Life history
The lifespan of the blacktail shiner is up to 4 years in the Leaf River system, Mississippi and up to 5 years in the Blanco River, Texas.

In Texas, the blacktail shiner spawning season is April through September. In Mississippi, it is late March through early October, with most females reproductive from April to early September. In Village Creek, Texas, blacktail shiners revealed size distribution patterns consistent with a protracted spawning season.

Populations in reservoirs chose crevice sites in locations of much lower current speeds. In the Blanco River, Texas, blacktail shiners were observed depositing eggs underneath small boulders and large cobble in a bedrock riffle in the swiftest current velocities available. Males respond to sounds produced by spawning females and are able to distinguish these sounds from those produced by related female red shiners. Males are territorial, defending a crevice from other males. Breeding pair swims along the crevice, the female deposits eggs; usually the sperm has already been released into the crevice, so the eggs are deposited into a crevice with viable sperm. Immediately after spawning, the male doubles back and eats any eggs that failed to make it into the crevice. Small males (sneakers) try to fertilize eggs by darting between the dominant male and spawning female. Both large and small males will enter another male's territory and deposit sperm in a crevice before the male courts a female to lay eggs in the crevice.

One study in the Blanco River, Texas found that female blacktail shiners had up to 340 ova. Females from the Pearl River, Mississippi, spawned 20-46 clutches during the reproductive season.

Management
The blacktail shiner is of relatively low conservation concern. Their populations are stable, but some issues of concern include habitat changes associated with flood control projects, siltation from development sites, deterioration of water quality, and recent water drawdown for mining and irrigation. Activities such as construction and operation of hydroelectric facilities, flood control, additional irrigation diversions, bank stabilization, oil and gas drilling, mining, grazing, stocking or introduction of nonnative fishes may jeopardize the continued existence of the blacktail shiner.  Another potential impact on the population could be hybridization.

References

Cyprinella
Freshwater fish of the Southeastern United States
Taxa named by Charles Frédéric Girard
Fish described in 1856